Wanelo (“wah-nee-loh,” from Want, Need, Love) is a digital mall where people can discover and buy products on the internet. The site has over 12 million products posted by users from over 300,000 stores, including both large brands and independent sellers, like those found on Etsy. Wanelo launched in 2012 and is headquartered in San Francisco’s SoMa district.

Deena Varshavskaya, Wanelo’s founder and CEO, started the company. Varshavskaya found it frustrating to shop for unique items in mainstream malls and wanted to know what her friends were shopping for, but there was not yet an existing platform that made online social shopping easy. Varshavskaya, born in Siberia, moved to the US when she was 16. She attended Cornell University, left two classes short of graduating, and founded two companies before starting Wanelo. She was named to Glamour Magazine's 35 Women Under 35 Who Are Changing the Tech Industry in 2014 and Most Creative People 2014 by Fast Company.

Usage

As of August 2014, Wanelo had 11 million registered users, up from one million in November 2012. 90% of Wanelo’s members are women, though the number of male users on the site is increasing. Along with its website, Wanelo has mobile apps for iOS and Android operating systems. 85% of Wanelo's traffic is from mobile devices.

Users can create an account on the site by signing up via email or connecting via Facebook. On Wanelo, all products are posted by users and everything on the site is purchasable. Wanelo users can collect products, follow stores and people and see what’s trending on the site. Wanelo users post links to items they want to buy from any online store by using the POST+ link online, the Google Chrome extension, or with Wanelo’s browser bookmarklet. Users can also “Save” items others have posted on Wanelo into their own wish lists, or make purchases by clicking “Buy”.

When users post products from a new store, a representative from that store can then "claim" their store page and manage its posting on Wanelo. Users can also search for products via hashtags, like many other social networks.

Business
Wanelo is a social platform where users come to shop. Retailers and brands are able to claim and manage their store pages, enabling them to engage with the community via comments, stories, and gain visibility to which of their products are trending. Some retailers, including Abercrombie & Fitch, are adding the Wanelo Save button to their e-commerce websites.

Funding
Wanelo has raised US$14 million in funding. It closed its seed-funding round in March 2012 from Floodgate Capital, First Round Capital, Forerunner Ventures, Naval Ravikant, and others. In March 2013, Wanelo raised another US$11 million, reportedly raising their valuation to US$100 million.

References

External links
 Official Website

Online retailers of the United States
Internet properties established in 2012
Social networks